is a Japanese lawyer, diplomat, academic and author.  He has been a professor of law at Keio University since 1999; and since 2009, he has served as the university's vice president for International Collaboration and Education.

Early life
Naoyuki was born in Tokyo in 1951. He is the son of the novelist and historian Hiroyuki Agawa.  His younger sister is the writer and Japanese television personality Sawako Agawa.

Naoyuki undergraduate education began at Keio University; but in 1975, he transferred in 1975 to Georgetown University in Washington, DC. He graduated magna cum laude in 1977 from the School of Foreign Service.  He returned to Japan after earning his B.S.F.S.; but he would return to Georgetown, earning a J.D. degree in 1984.

Career
In 1977, Naoyuki joined the Sony Corporation, working in Tokyo on matters relating to international trade and copyright law.

After earning a law degree, he practiced law—initially with the firm of Gibson, Dunn & Crutcher in Washington and Tokyo (1987–1995) and then with Nishimura & Partners in Tokyo (1995–1999).

In 1999, Naoyuki joined the Keio University faculty.  He taught American constitutional law and history.

From 2002 through 2005, he served as Minister for Public Affairs at the Embassy of Japan in Washington.

Naoyuki returned to Keio in April 2005.  He was elected Dean of the Faculty of Policy Management between June 2007 and June 2009. He became vice-president in charge of international affairs at Keio in July 2009.

After leaving the position of Vice-President he took up a position as professor of constitutional law at Doshisha University in Kyoto.

Select works
Naoyuki Agawa's published writings encompass 8 works in 31 publications in 1 language and 168 library holdings.

 2003 — それでも私は親米を貫
 2002 — 対論日本とアメリカ 
 2001 — 海の友情: 米国海軍と海上自衛隊
 2001 — ジョン万次郎とその時代
 1998 — わが英語今も旅の途中
 1998 — アメリカが見つかりましたか: 戦前篇 
 1997 — 変わらぬアメリカを探して
 1993 — アメリカが嫌いですか

Honors
Agawa was distinguished in 2005 as the recipient of the Yomiuri-Yoshino Sakuzo Award.

See also
 Sequentennial of Japanese Embassy to the United States

Notes

External links
 Library of Congress webcast: Highlights of Japan-US relationship (2007) with Norman Mineta, Midori Goto, Naoyuki Agawa, Michael Auslin

Japanese writers
Living people
1951 births
Keio University alumni
Academic staff of Keio University
Walsh School of Foreign Service alumni
Sony people
People from Tokyo
Scholars of constitutional law
American lawyers
Georgetown University Law Center alumni
People associated with Gibson Dunn